The Moldova–European Union Association Agreement is a treaty between the European Union (EU), Euratom, their 27 Member States and Moldova that establishes a political and economic association between the two parties.

The agreement established a Deep and Comprehensive Free Trade Area (DCFTA) between the EU and Moldova, including "the removal of import duties for most goods traded between the EU and Moldova" and "broad mutual access to trade in services for both partners".

The parties committed to co-operate and converge economic policy, legislation, and regulation across a broad range of areas, including equal rights for workers, the exchange of information and staff in the area of justice, the modernisation of Moldova's energy infrastructure, and access to the European Investment Bank. The parties committed to regular summit meetings, and meetings among ministers, other officials, and experts.

The agreement commits Moldova to economic, judicial and financial reforms to converge its policies and legislation to those of the European Union.

History

The EU Association Agreement (AA) was initialed on 29 November 2013 in Brussels. It was signed on 27 June 2014 and was being provisionally applied (in particular the DCFTA) starting 1 September 2014.

On 1 July 2016, the Association Agreement (AA) between the European Union and the Republic of Moldova fully came into force, following ratification by all 31 signatories.

Ratification

The 31 parties are Moldova, the EU and Euratom and the 28 EU members.

Ratification notes

Malta
The ratification was performed in accordance with article 4(2)(b) of the Maltese European Union Act, which reads that:
"Provided that with regard to treaties and international conventions which Malta may accede to as Member State of the European Union, and treaties and international conventions which Malta is bound to ratify in its own name or on behalf of the European Community by virtue of its membership within the
European Union, these shall come into force one month following their being submitted in order to be discussed by the Standing Committee on Foreign and European Affairs."
As the treaty was submitted to the Standing Committee on Foreign and European Affairs on 21 July 2014, the treaty came into force as part of the Maltese legislation on 21 August 2014.

United Kingdom of Great Britain and Northern Ireland
The ratification was based on The European Union (Definition of Treaties) (Association Agreement) (Moldova) Order 2015, made in accordance with section 1(3) of the European Communities Act 1972, after having been approved by a resolution of each House of Parliament.

Application in the United Kingdom
The agreement applied to the United Kingdom as an EU-member state until Brexit on 31 January 2020. During the transition period that followed Brexit, the agreement until 31 December 2020, the agreement still applied to the UK. The UK and Moldova announced on 8 October 2020 an agreement replacing the EU-Moldova Association Agreement between them, which was provisionally applied from 1 January 2021.

Later developments
In 2014 Russia imposed retaliatory trade restrictions on farming exports from Moldova in response to their signing of the Association Agreement with the EU. Amongst other measures, on August 31, Russia suspended 19 provisions of the Russia-Moldova CIS Free Trade Agreement signed in 2011.

Igor Dodon, who was elected President of Moldova in November 2016, campaigned on holding a referendum on cancelling the agreement in favour of joining the Eurasian Economic Union.

See also

Ukraine–European Union Association Agreement
Georgia–European Union Association Agreement

References

External links
EU-Moldova Association Agreement – the complete texts  from the European External Action Service

Moldova–European Union relations
Treaties entered into by the European Union
2014 in the European Union
Treaties concluded in 2014
2014 in Moldova